The 2009–10 Football League One season saw Millwall promoted back to The Championship via the Play-offs, after finishing 3rd in the table. Millwall celebrated their 125th anniversary this season. It was the club's 84th continuous season in the Football League and 41st in the third tier.

Squad

League table

References

External links
Official Website

2009–10
2009–10 Football League One by team